Robert Atzorn (born 2 February 1945) is a German television actor.
He was born in Bad Polzin, Pomerania, Germany, now Połczyn-Zdrój, West Pomeranian Voivodeship, Poland.

Life 

Robert Atzorn grew up in Oldenburg and Hamburg. He studied graphic design at the Art School Alsterdamm in Hamburg, however, felt drawn to the theater and therefore moved to the Neue Münchner Schauspielschule (1967-1969). In the season 1969/70 he got his first job at the Württembergische Landesbühne. Engagements followed at the Schauspielhaus Zürich (1970/1971), at the Theater Münster (1971/1972), at the Bühnen der Stadt Köln (1972/73), at the Theater Dortmund (1973-1975) and at the Residenz Theatre in Munich (1977-1983).

1980 Robert Atzorn played his first film role in From the Life of the Marionettes, directed by Ingmar Bergman. After many years in the theater, he worked exclusively since the mid-1980s for television. A wider audience, he was in the late 1980s alongside Maren Kroymann in the family series Oh Gott, Herr Pfarrer. For his portrayal of unconventional pastor in 1989, he received the Goldene Kamera. He became a crowd favorite in the title role of the evening series Unser Lehrer Doktor Specht, which was broadcast from 1992 to 1999 in 70 episodes. In 1993 he was honored with the Telestar. Robert Atzorn worked also in various episodes of the television series Forsthaus Falkenau, The Black Forest Clinic and Alphateam – Die Lebensretter im OP, and the crime series Derrick, Ein Fall für zwei, The Old Fox, Tatort and Die Männer vom K3.

As the successor of Manfred Krug and Charles Brauer he investigated from 2001 to 2008 as Tatort-homicide detective Jan Casstorff along with Tilo Prückner as Commissioner Holicek and Julia Schmidt as Jenny Graf for the NDR. The Tatort episode "Und tschüss" in February 2008 also meant the departure of Atzorn's investigator team.

He was also seen in 2002 Dieter Wedel's miniseries Die Affäre Semmeling as mayor Klaus Hennig. In the romantic comedy Kiss Me, Chancellor (2004) he slipped into the role of a head of government who falls in love with a maid, played by Andrea Sawatzki. In the ZDF production Africa, mon amour (2007) he played opposite Iris Berben, as occurred with Matti Geschonneck's Wer liebt, hat Recht and in Das Kommando. In the TV drama Mein Mann, der Trinker he played in 2008 with Franziska Walser a couple whose marriage is put to a severe test. 2008 after a long break came with two new episodes of the adventure series Der Kapitän, in which he portrayed from 1997 to 2000 already the figure of Captain Frank Harmsen.

Robert Atzorn is married since 1976 with Angelika Hartung, both have two adult sons.

Selected filmography

Movies and TV movies

TV series

External links

 
 
 Carola Studlar Agency Munich 

1945 births
Living people
People from Połczyn-Zdrój
Male actors from Hamburg
German male television actors
German male film actors
People from the Province of Pomerania
20th-century German male actors
21st-century German male actors
German male stage actors